Atrypanius irrorellus is a species of longhorn beetles of the subfamily Lamiinae. It was described by Henry Walter Bates in 1855, and is known from Mexico to Panama, and Trinidad.

References

Beetles described in 1855
Acanthocinini